Old St Lawrence Church is a ruined building in Ayot St Lawrence, Hertfordshire, England.
It is protected as a Grade II* listed building, and dates back to the 12th century.

The building was partially demolished in 1775 by Sir Lionel Lyde, 1st Baronet, who had acquired a country home, Ayot House, close by.
It was replaced as the village's parish church by new St Lawrence Church, a neoclassical structure which Lyde had built on a site slightly further from his house.

The last baptism to take place at Old St Lawrence Church was on the 21st February 1773 for Susan George.
New St Lawrence Church was consecrated in 1779.

Graveyard
Although Lionel Lyde and his wife Rachel are commemorated at the new church, the old churchyard remained in use. Burials include Rudolph Lambart, 10th Earl of Cavan (1865 – 1946), whose maternal grandfather was rector of Ayot St Lawrence. Earl Cavan was a Field marshal and his resting place is registered by the Commonwealth War Graves Commission.
Although the Earl was not a casualty in the normal sense of the term, the entry refers to the "memorial to the casualty in the form of a large 7' red granite celtic cross".

References

External links

Buildings and structures in Ayot St Lawrence
Church ruins in England
Churchyards in England
Commonwealth War Graves Commission cemeteries in England
 Ayot
Ruins in Hertfordshire